Vojany is a village and municipality in Michalovce District in the Kosice Region of eastern Slovakia.

History
In historical records the village was first mentioned in 1323.

Geography
The village lies at an altitude of 102 metres and covers an area of 10.923 km². The municipality has a population of about 830 people.

Government
The village has its own birth registry.

Culture
The village has a public library, and a football pitch. It also has a doctors surgery.

Transport
The village has a railway station.

Economy
 Vojany Power Station

External links

http://www.statistics.sk/mosmis/eng/run.html

Villages and municipalities in Michalovce District